Agrarian revolution may refer to either:

 List of peasant revolts against various states
 Agricultural revolution (disambiguation)

See also

 Agronomic revolution
 Green Revolution (disambiguation)
 
 Revolution (disambiguation)
 Agrarian (disambiguation)
 Agrarian change